William Edward Browne (19 March 1902 – 22 August 1948) was an Australian rules footballer who played with South Melbourne and Hawthorn in the Victorian Football League (VFL).

Notes

External links 

1902 births
1948 deaths
Australian rules footballers from Victoria (Australia)
Sydney Swans players
Hawthorn Football Club players